Francis Noel Palmer (1887-18 January 1961) was a British politician.

He was the son of Nathaniel Palmer of Yarmouth. In 1906 he joined the Labour Party. During the First World War he was granted a commission as a second lieutenant in the Essex Regiment, but was discharged from the army with tuberculosis.  He lived at Normandy, Surrey and was chosen as Labour candidate to contest the local parliamentary constituency of Farnham in 1929. In October 1931 Palmer was expelled from the Labour Party for supporting the National Government, moving into the National Labour Organisation led by the Prime Minister, Ramsay MacDonald.

He was a parliamentary candidate at the 1931 general election at Tottenham North. He unseated the sitting Labour member, Frederick Messer and was one of 13 National Labour MPs elected. The situation was reversed when he lost the seat to Messer at the next general election in 1935. By the 1940s his sand and gravel business was in receivership.

He died in 1961.

References

External links 
 

1887 births
1961 deaths
National Labour (UK) politicians
UK MPs 1931–1935
Members of the Parliament of the United Kingdom for English constituencies
Essex Regiment officers
British Army personnel of World War I